Lene Køppen (born 5 May 1953) is a former badminton player from Denmark who won numerous Danish national and major international championships from the early 1970s through the early 1980s. Noted for her speed and athleticism,  she and Camilla Martin are the only Danish women to win both the World (1977) and All-England (1979, 1980) singles titles. In the first IBF World Championships in 1977 she captured  mixed doubles (with Steen Skovgaard) as well as women's singles to become the first of only seven players, through 2010, to win two events in the same edition of this tournament. Notably, her badminton success came as she was studying and then practising dentistry. She was elected to the World Badminton Hall of Fame in 1998. She is the mother of badminton player Marie Røpke.

Achievements

World Championships

World Cup

World Games

European Championships

European Junior Championships

International tournaments

References

External links
 Lene Køppen's Profile - Badminton.dk
 

1953 births
Living people
Danish female badminton players
World Games medalists in badminton
World Games bronze medalists
Competitors at the 1981 World Games